Idaotsa is a village in Viimsi Parish, Harju County in northern Estonia, on the island of Prangli. The nearby Aksi island also belongs to Idaotsa village.

References

 

Villages in Harju County